Zion Church is a historic Episcopal church building located in Rome, Oneida County, New York.  The church was designed by noted national church architect, Richard Upjohn, (1802-1878), built in 1850.  It is a three-by-four-bay structure built of bluestone in the Gothic Revival style.  Located adjacent is the stone "Clarke Memorial Hall" designed by local designer Frederick Hubbard and built a quarter-century later in 1884–1885.

It was listed in 1997 on the National Register of Historic Places which is maintained by the U.S. Department of the Interior's National Park Service.

References

Churches on the National Register of Historic Places in New York (state)
Episcopal church buildings in New York (state)
Gothic Revival church buildings in New York (state)
Richard Upjohn church buildings
Churches completed in 1850
Rome, New York
19th-century Episcopal church buildings
National Register of Historic Places in Oneida County, New York